There are two natural isotopes of iridium (77Ir), and 37 radioisotopes, the most stable radioisotope being 192Ir with a half-life of 73.83 days, and many nuclear isomers, the most stable of which is 192m2Ir with a half-life of 241 years. All other isomers have half-lives under a year, most under a day. All isotopes of iridium are either radioactive or observationally stable, meaning that they are predicted to be radioactive but no actual decay has been observed.

List of isotopes 

|-
| 164Ir
| style="text-align:right" | 77
| style="text-align:right" | 87
| 163.99220(44)#
| 1# ms
|
|
| 2−#
|
|
|-
| style="text-indent:1em" | 164mIr
| colspan="3" style="text-indent:2em" | 270(110)# keV
| 94(27) µs
|
|
| 9+#
|
|
|-
| rowspan=2|165Ir
| rowspan=2 style="text-align:right" | 77
| rowspan=2 style="text-align:right" | 88
| rowspan=2|164.98752(23)#
| rowspan=2|50# ns (<1 µs)
| p
| 164Os
| rowspan=2|1/2+#
| rowspan=2|
| rowspan=2|
|-
| α (rare)
| 161Re
|-
| rowspan=2 style="text-indent:1em" | 165mIr
| rowspan=2 colspan="3" style="text-indent:2em" | 180(50)# keV
| rowspan=2|300(60) µs
| p (87%)
| 164Os
| rowspan=2|11/2−
| rowspan=2|
| rowspan=2|
|-
| α (13%)
| 161Re
|-
| rowspan=2|166Ir
| rowspan=2 style="text-align:right" | 77
| rowspan=2 style="text-align:right" | 89
| rowspan=2|165.98582(22)#
| rowspan=2|10.5(22) ms
| α (93%)
| 162Re
| rowspan=2|(2−)
| rowspan=2|
| rowspan=2|
|-
| p (7%)
| 165Os
|-
| rowspan=2 style="text-indent:1em" | 166mIr
| rowspan=2 colspan="3" style="text-indent:2em" | 172(6) keV
| rowspan=2|15.1(9) ms
| α (98.2%)
| 162Re
| rowspan=2|(9+)
| rowspan=2|
| rowspan=2|
|-
| p (1.8%)
| 165Os
|-
| rowspan=3|167Ir
| rowspan=3 style="text-align:right" | 77
| rowspan=3 style="text-align:right" | 90
| rowspan=3|166.981665(20)
| rowspan=3|35.2(20) ms
| α (48%)
| 163Re
| rowspan=3|1/2+
| rowspan=3|
| rowspan=3|
|-
| p (32%)
| 166Os
|-
| β+ (20%)
| 167Os
|-
| rowspan=3 style="text-indent:1em" | 167mIr
| rowspan=3 colspan="3" style="text-indent:2em" | 175.3(22) keV
| rowspan=3|30.0(6) ms
| α (80%)
| 163Re
| rowspan=3|11/2−
| rowspan=3|
| rowspan=3|
|-
| β+ (20%)
| 167Os
|-
| p (.4%)
| 166Os
|-
| rowspan=2|168Ir
| rowspan=2 style="text-align:right" | 77
| rowspan=2 style="text-align:right" | 91
| rowspan=2|167.97988(16)#
| rowspan=2|161(21) ms
| α
| 164Re
| rowspan=2|(2-)
| rowspan=2|
| rowspan=2|
|-
| β+ (rare)
| 168Os
|-
| style="text-indent:1em" | 168mIr
| colspan="3" style="text-indent:2em" | 50(100)# keV
| 125(40) ms
| α
| 164Re
| (9+)
|
|
|-
| rowspan=2|169Ir
| rowspan=2 style="text-align:right" | 77
| rowspan=2 style="text-align:right" | 92
| rowspan=2|168.976295(28)
| rowspan=2|780(360) ms[0.64(+46−24) s]
| α
| 165Re
| rowspan=2|(1/2+)
| rowspan=2|
| rowspan=2|
|-
| β+ (rare)
| 169Os
|-
| rowspan=2 style="text-indent:1em" | 169mIr
| rowspan=2 colspan="3" style="text-indent:2em" | 154(24) keV
| rowspan=2|308(22) ms
| α (72%)
| 165Re
| rowspan=2|(11/2−)
| rowspan=2|
| rowspan=2|
|-
| β+ (28%)
| 169Os
|-
| rowspan=2|170Ir
| rowspan=2 style="text-align:right" | 77
| rowspan=2 style="text-align:right" | 93
| rowspan=2|169.97497(11)#
| rowspan=2|910(150) ms[0.87(+18−12) s]
| β+ (64%)
| 170Os
| rowspan=2|low#
| rowspan=2|
| rowspan=2|
|-
| α (36%)
| 166Re
|-
| rowspan=3 style="text-indent:1em" | 170mIr
| rowspan=3 colspan="3" style="text-indent:2em" | 160(50)# keV
| rowspan=3|440(60) ms
| α (36%)
| 166Re
| rowspan=3|(8+)
| rowspan=3|
| rowspan=3|
|-
| β+
| 170Os
|-
| IT
| 170Ir
|-
| rowspan=2|171Ir
| rowspan=2 style="text-align:right" | 77
| rowspan=2 style="text-align:right" | 94
| rowspan=2|170.97163(4)
| rowspan=2|3.6(10) s[3.2(+13−7) s]
| α (58%)
| 167Re
| rowspan=2|1/2+
| rowspan=2|
| rowspan=2|
|-
| β+ (42%)
| 171Os
|-
| style="text-indent:1em" | 171mIr
| colspan="3" style="text-indent:2em" | 180(30)# keV
| 1.40(10) s
|
|
| (11/2−)
|
|
|-
| rowspan=2|172Ir
| rowspan=2 style="text-align:right" | 77
| rowspan=2 style="text-align:right" | 95
| rowspan=2|171.970610(30)
| rowspan=2|4.4(3) s
| β+ (98%)
| 172Os
| rowspan=2|(3+)
| rowspan=2|
| rowspan=2|
|-
| α (2%)
| 168Re
|-
| rowspan=2 style="text-indent:1em" | 172mIr
| rowspan=2 colspan="3" style="text-indent:2em" | 280(100)# keV
| rowspan=2|2.0(1) s
| β+ (77%)
| 172Os
| rowspan=2|(7+)
| rowspan=2|
| rowspan=2|
|-
| α (23%)
| 168Re
|-
| rowspan=2|173Ir
| rowspan=2 style="text-align:right" | 77
| rowspan=2 style="text-align:right" | 96
| rowspan=2|172.967502(15)
| rowspan=2|9.0(8) s
| β+ (93%)
| 173Os
| rowspan=2|(3/2+,5/2+)
| rowspan=2|
| rowspan=2|
|-
| α (7%)
| 169Re
|-
| rowspan=2 style="text-indent:1em" | 173mIr
| rowspan=2 colspan="3" style="text-indent:2em" | 253(27) keV
| rowspan=2|2.20(5) s
| β+ (88%)
| 173Os
| rowspan=2|(11/2−)
| rowspan=2|
| rowspan=2|
|-
| α (12%)
| 169Re
|-
| rowspan=2|174Ir
| rowspan=2 style="text-align:right" | 77
| rowspan=2 style="text-align:right" | 97
| rowspan=2|173.966861(30)
| rowspan=2|7.9(6) s
| β+ (99.5%)
| 174Os
| rowspan=2|(3+)
| rowspan=2|
| rowspan=2|
|-
| α (.5%)
| 170Re
|-
| rowspan=2 style="text-indent:1em" | 174mIr
| rowspan=2 colspan="3" style="text-indent:2em" | 193(11) keV
| rowspan=2|4.9(3) s
| β+ (99.53%)
| 174Os
| rowspan=2|(7+)
| rowspan=2|
| rowspan=2|
|-
| α (.47%)
| 170Re
|-
| rowspan=2|175Ir
| rowspan=2 style="text-align:right" | 77
| rowspan=2 style="text-align:right" | 98
| rowspan=2|174.964113(21)
| rowspan=2|9(2) s
| β+ (99.15%)
| 175Os
| rowspan=2|(5/2−)
| rowspan=2|
| rowspan=2|
|-
| α (.85%)
| 171Re
|-
| rowspan=2|176Ir
| rowspan=2 style="text-align:right" | 77
| rowspan=2 style="text-align:right" | 99
| rowspan=2|175.963649(22)
| rowspan=2|8.3(6) s
| β+ (97.9%)
| 176Os
| rowspan=2|
| rowspan=2|
| rowspan=2|
|-
| α (2.1%)
| 172Re
|-
| rowspan=2|177Ir
| rowspan=2 style="text-align:right" | 77
| rowspan=2 style="text-align:right" | 100
| rowspan=2|176.961302(21)
| rowspan=2|30(2) s
| β+ (99.94%)
| 177Os
| rowspan=2|5/2−
| rowspan=2|
| rowspan=2|
|-
| α (.06%)
| 173Re
|-
| 178Ir
| style="text-align:right" | 77
| style="text-align:right" | 101
| 177.961082(21)
| 12(2) s
| β+
| 178Os
|
|
|
|-
| 179Ir
| style="text-align:right" | 77
| style="text-align:right" | 102
| 178.959122(12)
| 79(1) s
| β+
| 179Os
| (5/2)−
|
|
|-
| 180Ir
| style="text-align:right" | 77
| style="text-align:right" | 103
| 179.959229(23)
| 1.5(1) min
| β+
| 180Os
| (4,5)(+#)
|
|
|-
| 181Ir
| style="text-align:right" | 77
| style="text-align:right" | 104
| 180.957625(28)
| 4.90(15) min
| β+
| 181Os
| (5/2)−
|
|
|-
| 182Ir
| style="text-align:right" | 77
| style="text-align:right" | 105
| 181.958076(23)
| 15(1) min
| β+
| 182Os
| (3+)
|
|
|-
| rowspan=2|183Ir
| rowspan=2 style="text-align:right" | 77
| rowspan=2 style="text-align:right" | 106
| rowspan=2|182.956846(27)
| rowspan=2|57(4) min
| β+ ( 99.95%)
| 183Os
| rowspan=2|5/2−
| rowspan=2|
| rowspan=2|
|-
| α (.05%)
| 179Re
|-
| 184Ir
| style="text-align:right" | 77
| style="text-align:right" | 107
| 183.95748(3)
| 3.09(3) h
| β+
| 184Os
| 5−
|
|
|-
| style="text-indent:1em" | 184m1Ir
| colspan="3" style="text-indent:2em" | 225.65(11) keV
| 470(30) µs
|
|
| 3+
|
|
|-
| style="text-indent:1em" | 184m2Ir
| colspan="3" style="text-indent:2em" | 328.40(24) keV
| 350(90) ns
|
|
| (7)+
|
|
|-
| 185Ir
| style="text-align:right" | 77
| style="text-align:right" | 108
| 184.95670(3)
| 14.4(1) h
| β+
| 185Os
| 5/2−
|
|
|-
| 186Ir
| style="text-align:right" | 77
| style="text-align:right" | 109
| 185.957946(18)
| 16.64(3) h
| β+
| 186Os
| 5+
|
|
|-
| rowspan=2 style="text-indent:1em" | 186mIr
| rowspan=2 colspan="3" style="text-indent:2em" | 0.8(4) keV
| rowspan=2|1.92(5) h
| β+
| 186Os
| rowspan=2|2−
| rowspan=2|
| rowspan=2|
|-
| IT (rare)
| 186Ir
|-
| 187Ir
| style="text-align:right" | 77
| style="text-align:right" | 110
| 186.957363(7)
| 10.5(3) h
| β+
| 187Os
| 3/2+
|
|
|-
| style="text-indent:1em" | 187m1Ir
| colspan="3" style="text-indent:2em" | 186.15(4) keV
| 30.3(6) ms
| IT
| 187Ir
| 9/2−
|
|
|-
| style="text-indent:1em" | 187m2Ir
| colspan="3" style="text-indent:2em" | 433.81(9) keV
| 152(12) ns
|
|
| 11/2−
|
|
|-
| 188Ir
| style="text-align:right" | 77
| style="text-align:right" | 111
| 187.958853(8)
| 41.5(5) h
| β+
| 188Os
| 1−
|
|
|-
| rowspan=2 style="text-indent:1em" | 188mIr
| rowspan=2 colspan="3" style="text-indent:2em" | 970(30) keV
| rowspan=2|4.2(2) ms
| IT
| 188Ir
| rowspan=2|7+#
| rowspan=2|
| rowspan=2|
|-
| β+ (rare)
| 188Os
|-
| 189Ir
| style="text-align:right" | 77
| style="text-align:right" | 112
| 188.958719(14)
| 13.2(1) d
| EC
| 189Os
| 3/2+
|
|
|-
| style="text-indent:1em" | 189m1Ir
| colspan="3" style="text-indent:2em" | 372.18(4) keV
| 13.3(3) ms
| IT
| 189Ir
| 11/2−
|
|
|-
| style="text-indent:1em" | 189m2Ir
| colspan="3" style="text-indent:2em" | 2333.3(4) keV
| 3.7(2) ms
|
|
| (25/2)+
|
|
|-
| 190Ir
| style="text-align:right" | 77
| style="text-align:right" | 113
| 189.9605460(18)
| 11.78(10) d
| β+
| 190Os
| 4−
|
|
|-
| style="text-indent:1em" | 190m1Ir
| colspan="3" style="text-indent:2em" | 26.1(1) keV
| 1.120(3) h
| IT
| 190Ir
| (1−)
|
|
|-
| style="text-indent:1em" | 190m2Ir
| colspan="3" style="text-indent:2em" | 36.154(25) keV
| >2 µs
|
|
| (4)+
|
|
|-
| style="text-indent:1em" | 190m3Ir
| colspan="3" style="text-indent:2em" | 376.4(1) keV
| 3.087(12) h
|
|
| (11)−
|
|
|-
| 191Ir
| style="text-align:right" | 77
| style="text-align:right" | 114
| 190.9605940(18)
| colspan=3 align=center|Observationally Stable
| 3/2+
| 0.373(2)
|
|-
| style="text-indent:1em" | 191m1Ir
| colspan="3" style="text-indent:2em" | 171.24(5) keV
| 4.94(3) s
| IT
| 191Ir
| 11/2−
|
|
|-
| style="text-indent:1em" | 191m2Ir
| colspan="3" style="text-indent:2em" | 2120(40) keV
| 5.5(7) s
|
|
|
|
|
|-
| rowspan=2|192Ir
| rowspan=2 style="text-align:right" | 77
| rowspan=2 style="text-align:right" | 115
| rowspan=2|191.9626050(18)
| rowspan=2|73.827(13) d
| β− (95.24%)
| 192Pt
| rowspan=2|4+
| rowspan=2|
| rowspan=2|
|-
| EC (4.76%)
| 192Os
|-
| style="text-indent:1em" | 192m1Ir
| colspan="3" style="text-indent:2em" | 56.720(5) keV
| 1.45(5) min
|
|
| 1−
|
|
|-
| style="text-indent:1em" | 192m2Ir
| colspan="3" style="text-indent:2em" | 168.14(12) keV
| 241(9) y
|
|
| (11−)
|
|
|-
| 193Ir
| style="text-align:right" | 77
| style="text-align:right" | 116
| 192.9629264(18)
| colspan=3 align=center|Observationally Stable
| 3/2+
| 0.627(2)
|
|-
| style="text-indent:1em" | 193mIr
| colspan="3" style="text-indent:2em" | 80.240(6) keV
| 10.53(4) d
| IT
| 193Ir
| 11/2−
|
|
|-
| 194Ir
| style="text-align:right" | 77
| style="text-align:right" | 117
| 193.9650784(18)
| 19.28(13) h
| β−
| 194Pt
| 1−
|
|
|-
| style="text-indent:1em" | 194m1Ir
| colspan="3" style="text-indent:2em" | 147.078(5) keV
| 31.85(24) ms
| IT
| 194Ir
| (4+)
|
|
|-
| style="text-indent:1em" | 194m2Ir
| colspan="3" style="text-indent:2em" | 370(70) keV
| 171(11) d
|
|
| (10,11)(−#)
|
|
|-
| 195Ir
| style="text-align:right" | 77
| style="text-align:right" | 118
| 194.9659796(18)
| 2.5(2) h
| β−
| 195Pt
| 3/2+
|
|
|-
| rowspan=2 style="text-indent:1em" | 195mIr
| rowspan=2 colspan="3" style="text-indent:2em" | 100(5) keV
| rowspan=2|3.8(2) h
| β− (95%)
| 195Pt
| rowspan=2|11/2−
| rowspan=2| 
| rowspan=2|
|-
| IT (5%)
| 195Ir
|-
| 196Ir
| style="text-align:right" | 77
| style="text-align:right" | 119
| 195.96840(4)
| 52(1) s
| β−
| 196Pt
| (0−)
|
|
|-
| rowspan=2 style="text-indent:1em" | 196mIr
| rowspan=2 colspan="3" style="text-indent:2em" | 210(40) keV
| rowspan=2|1.40(2) h
| β− (99.7%)
| 196Pt
| rowspan=2|(10,11−)
| rowspan=2|
| rowspan=2|
|-
| IT
| 196Ir
|-
| 197Ir
| style="text-align:right" | 77
| style="text-align:right" | 120
| 196.969653(22)
| 5.8(5) min
| β−
| 197Pt
| 3/2+
|
|
|-
| rowspan=2 style="text-indent:1em" | 197mIr
| rowspan=2 colspan="3" style="text-indent:2em" | 115(5) keV
| rowspan=2|8.9(3) min
| β− (99.75%)
| 197Pt
| rowspan=2|11/2−
| rowspan=2|
| rowspan=2|
|-
| IT (.25%)
| 197Ir
|-
| 198Ir
| style="text-align:right" | 77
| style="text-align:right" | 121
| 197.97228(21)#
| 8(1) s
| β−
| 198Pt
|
|
|
|-
| 199Ir
| style="text-align:right" | 77
| style="text-align:right" | 122
| 198.97380(4)
| 7(5) s
| β−
| 199Pt
| 3/2+#
|
|
|-
| style="text-indent:1em" | 199mIr
| colspan="3" style="text-indent:2em" | 130(40)# keV
| 235(90) ns
| IT
| 199Ir
| 11/2−#
|
|
|-
| 200Ir
| style="text-align:right" | 77
| style="text-align:right" | 123
| 199.976800(210)#
| 43(6) s
| β−
| 200Pt
| (2-, 3-)
|
|
|-
| 201Ir
| style="text-align:right" | 77
| style="text-align:right" | 124
| 200.978640(210)#
| 21(5) s
| β−
| 201Pt
| (3/2+)
|
|
|-
| 202Ir
| style="text-align:right" | 77
| style="text-align:right" | 125
| 201.981990(320)#
| 11(3) s
| β−
| 202Pt
| (2-)
|
|
|-
| style="text-indent:1em" | 202mIr
| colspan="3" style="text-indent:2em" | 2000(1000)# keV
| 3.4(0.6) µs
| IT
| 202Ir
|
|
|

Iridium-192
Iridium-192 (symbol 192Ir) is a radioactive isotope of iridium, with a half-life of 73.83 days. It decays by emitting beta (β) particles and gamma (γ) radiation. About 96% of 192Ir decays occur via emission of β and γ radiation, leading to 192Pt. Some of the β particles are captured by other 192Ir nuclei, which are then converted to 192Os. Electron capture is responsible for the remaining 4% of 192Ir decays. Iridium-192 is normally produced by neutron activation of natural-abundance iridium metal.

Iridium-192 is a very strong gamma ray emitter, with a gamma dose-constant of approximately 1.54 μSv·h−1·MBq−1 at 30 cm, and a specific activity of 341 TBq·g−1 (9.22 kCi·g−1). There are seven principal energy packets produced during its disintegration process ranging from just over 0.2 to about 0.6 MeV.

Iridium-192 is commonly used as a gamma ray source in industrial radiography to locate flaws in metal components. It is also used in radiotherapy as a radiation source, in particular in brachytherapy.

Iridium-192 has accounted for the majority of cases tracked by the U.S Nuclear Regulatory Commission in which radioactive materials have gone missing in quantities large enough to make a dirty bomb.

The 192m2Ir isomer is unusual, both for its long half-life for an isomer, and that said half-life greatly exceeds that of the ground state of the same isotope.

References 

 Isotope masses from:

 Isotopic compositions and standard atomic masses from:

 Half-life, spin, and isomer data selected from the following sources.

External links
NLM Hazardous Substances Databank – Iridium, Radioactive (referring to iridium-192)

 
Iridium
Iridium